Guapi or Huapi (Mapudungun for island) is an island in Ranco Lake, southern Chile. Administratively it belongs to the commune of Futrono in Los Ríos Region.

Islands of Los Ríos Region
Lake islands of Chile